Saint-Chinian is a commune in the Hérault department in the Occitanie region in southern France. The town was the birthplace of the great tenor Agustarello Affre (1858–1931). He is commemorated by a plaque on the house where he was born, on the Avenue de Saint Pons.

Population

Saint-Chinian wine

Saint-Chinian has given its name to Saint-Chinian wine, which is classified as Appellation d'Origine Contrôlée (AOC) and covers several communes around Saint-Chinian itself.

See also
Communes of the Hérault department

References

Communes of Hérault